The Night Is Ours is a 1930 German drama film directed by Roger Lion, Carl Froelich and Henry Roussel and starring Marie Bell, Henry Roussel and Jean Murat. It was made in Berlin as the French-language version of the 1929 German film The Night Belongs to Us. It was shot at the Tempelhof Studios of UFA.

Cast

References

Bibliography

External links 
 

1930 films
1930 drama films
German drama films
French drama films
Films of the Weimar Republic
1930s French-language films
Films directed by Roger Lion
Films directed by Carl Froelich
Films directed by Henry Roussel
German films based on plays
German multilingual films
German black-and-white films
Tobis Film films
Films shot at Tempelhof Studios
1930 multilingual films
1930s German films
1930s French films